is a collection of illustrations by Japanese artist Yomu. The doujinshi manga began serialization online via Yomu's Twitter account in September 2019. Five volumes have been released as of August 2021. A short-form 12-episode original net animation (ONA) adaptation by AtelierPontdarc was released from September to December 2021.

Premise
The story follows Douki-chan, an office lady who works with Douki-kun. Unbeknownst to Douki-kun, Douki-chan secretly has feelings for him. As Douki-chan struggles to confess her feelings, her colleagues, both the kouhai co-worker, and their senpai from a related company, also vie for his affection.

Characters

An office worker at a Tokyo-based company. She is a serious worker and promising prospect within the company. However, she is inexperienced when it comes to romance and is unsure of how to approach the man she has feelings for.

The male office coworker of Douki-chan and Kouhai-chan. He is drawn without showing his eyes. He has a romantic interest towards Douki-chan and often goes to look after her when she gets isolated, but is too shy to confess his feelings to her.

A coy woman with a soft vibe who is always smiling. She is a junior in the same department as Douki-chan and Douki-kun. She is always trying to seduce Douki-kun and isolate him from the other girls. She enjoys cosplay, picking popular characters and leaving Douki-chan with less attractive mascot costumes. Many other men are attracted to her.

 is a woman with a mature female aura, and is the only character with an actual name and a visible name tag. She is currently an employee of a business partner. She is free-spirited and likes to drink.  As Douki-kun's senior in college, she was very close with him, but had turned down his confession, saying that she was already seeing someone. Her younger sister is Yuiko Okuzumi from the author's related web manga Miru Tights.

A girl with short blonde hair who gives Douki-kun a kiss on the lips the first time they bumped into each other. She becomes an intern in their department, and later a permanent hire. She easily deduces that Douki-chan has a crush on Douki-kun. In one of the chapters, she tells Douki-kun that she joined the company because she likes him romantically too, but quickly adds "just kidding". In a later chapter, it is revealed that her name is Shinchin-chan.

Media

Volume list

Original net animation
An original net animation (ONA) adaptation was announced on August 14, 2021. The series is produced by AtelierPontdarc and directed and storyboarded by Kazuomi Koga, with Yoshiko Nakamura writing the series' scripts, Yuki Morikawa designing the characters, and Ryōsuke Naya serving as the sound director. It was released on the Abema service from September 20 to December 6, 2021. Crunchyroll licensed the series outside of Asia. Muse Communication licensed the series in South and Southeast Asia.

Episode list

See also
 Tawawa on Monday, aired in tandem with Ganbare Dōki-chan in 2021, with a brief crossover promotion
 Miru Tights, another manga by Yomu

Explanatory notes

References

Works cited
 "Ch." is a shortened form for "chapter" and refers to chapters of the Ganbare Doukichan manga.

Other references

External links
  
 

2019 webcomic debuts
2021 anime ONAs
Anime series based on manga
Crunchyroll anime
Doujinshi
Japanese webcomics
Muse Communication
Romantic comedy anime and manga
Webcomics in print